Robert Stephen Adamson (2 March 1885 – 6 November 1965) was a British botanist. He was a fellow of Linnean Society (elected in 1956), the British Ecological Society and the Royal Society of South Africa and its President in 1946-1948.

Adamson is commemorated in the specific epithet adamsonii.

Works 

 On the ecology of the Ooldea district (1922)
 The ecology of the eucalyptus forests of the Mount Lofty ranges (Adelaide district), South Australia (1924)
 The Botanical features of the south western Cape Province: essays (1929)
 A revision of the South African species of Juncus (1935)
 The vegetation of South Africa (1938)
Notes on the vegetation of the Kamiesberg (1938)
 Flora of the Cape Peninsula (1950)

References 

English botanists
1885 births
1965 deaths
Scientists from Manchester
20th-century British botanists